(German for Dance of the Blessed Spirits) is a string quartet composed by Helmut Lachenmann in 1989.

History 
This is Helmut Lachenmann's second string quartet, after Gran Torso (1971–1972) and before Grido (2001). The title is based on the name , from Gluck's opera Orfeo ed Euridice.

The German composer wrote a text on this work entitled "On my Second String Quartet" (1995–2002), published in Écrits et Entretiens.

It takes about half an hour to execute.

Analysis 
This quartet is characterized by its various playing modes, which require to play first flautando, then by playing the bow on the chevilles or the scroll of the instrument, then by "rocket sounds", executed by pushing the bow on the string in an accelerated manner, or in pizzicato. At some point, musicians must use a plectrum and place their instrument on their knees like a guitar.

Discography 
 Reigen Seliger Geister, Tanzsuite mit Deutschlandlied, Arditti Quartet, Montaigne 1994, Naïve Records, 2000.
 Grido – Reigen Seliger Geister – Gran Torso, Arditti Quartet, Kairos, 2007.
 String Quartets, Stadler Quartett, NEOS, 2010.
 Complete String Quartets, JACK Quartet, Mode Records/WDR, 2015.

References

External links 
 
 , Arditti Quartet

1989 compositions
Compositions that use extended techniques
String quartets